Ernesto Galarza (August 15, 1905–June 22, 1984) was a Mexican-American labor organizer, activist, professor, poet, writer, storyteller, and a key figure in the history of immigrant farmworker organization in California. He had a dream of giving better living conditions to working-class Latinos.

Early life
Born in Jalcocotan in the Mexican state of Nayarit, Galarza immigrated with his mother and two uncles to California.  As recalled in his autobiography, Barrio Boy, the young man successfully navigated the cultural differences in the public school system, received a scholarship to Occidental College in Los Angeles, and then went on to earn a master's degree in history at Stanford University in 1929.

Career
Galarza worked with the Pan-American Union (now the Organization of American States) in Washington D.C. from 1936 through 1947 publishing analyses on educational, labor, and infrastructure issues in Latin America. In 1947, he completed his doctoral dissertation on the electricity industry in Mexico and earned a Ph.D. from Columbia University.

Galarza worked as a labor organizer and a key leader in laying the groundwork for the emergence in California of the farm labor movement. Galarza began organizing farmworkers in California in 1948 as research and education director of the American Federation of Labor's short-lived National Farm Labor Union strike against the DiGiorgio Corporation in Arvin, California that lasted 30  months, and entangled the company and the union in suits and counter-suits for the following 15  years. Altogether between 1948 and 1959, Galarza and the union initiated some twenty strikes and labor actions. 

Although primarily an intellectual and scholar whose weapons were words, Galarza initially played an activist's role with the AFL as the leader of several strikes. But he was completely thwarted by the bracero program and so abandoned the union leader's weapon of direct economic action for the intellectual's weapon of words in hopes of killing the program. 

A prolific writer, Galarza's best-known work is Merchants of Labor (1964), an exposé of the abuses within the Bracero Program. The book was instrumental in the ending of the program, which in turn opened the door for Cesar Chavez to begin unionizing immigrant farmworkers in 1965.

In 1956 Galarza was awarded the Bolivian Order of the Condor of the Andes. The Ernesto Galarza Applied Research Center at the University of California Riverside and other California elementary and secondary schools bear his name. His many books include:  

 Barrio Boy, 1971
 Merchants of Labor: The Mexican Bracero Story, 1964
 Spiders in the House and Workers in the Field, 1970

Salinas Valley tragedy

In the wake of a bus crash in the Salinas Valley in September 1963 that claimed the lives of 32 braceros, Galarza was appointed to investigate the tragedy by Adam Clayton Powell, Jr., chairman of the Committee on Education and Labor of the U.S. House of Representatives. His report, published by the committee in April 1964, found that the accident was directly caused by negligence, exemplifying a practice in which flatbed trucks were illegally converted to buses, driven by poorly trained personnel. With safety officials and regulators indifferent to the situation, and businesses showing disregard for human life, he found that the accident had been imminent.  He wrote a book on the accident, Tragedy at Chualar (1977).

References 

Trade unionists from California
Activists for Hispanic and Latino American civil rights
Agricultural labor in the United States
20th-century American non-fiction writers
Hispanic and Latino American autobiographers
American autobiographers
American writers of Mexican descent
Latin Americanists
Occidental College alumni
Stanford University alumni
Columbia Graduate School of Arts and Sciences alumni
Politicians from Tepic, Nayarit
1905 births
1984 deaths
 Southern Tenant Farmers Union people
Mexican emigrants to the United States